Skarbimierz-Osiedle  is a village in the administrative district of Gmina Skarbimierz, within Brzeg County, Opole Voivodeship, in south-western Poland.

The village has a population of 1,845.

References

Skarbimierz Osiedle